William Thomas Humphreys (1884–unknown) was an English footballer who played in the Football League for Bury.

References

1884 births
English footballers
Association football midfielders
English Football League players
Chorley F.C. players
Bury F.C. players
Barrow A.F.C. players
Year of death missing